Edsel Albert Ammons (February 17, 1924 – December 24, 2010) was an American bishop of the United Methodist Church, elected in 1976.

Birth and family
Ammons was born 17 February 1924 in Chicago, Illinois. He died 24 December 2010.  He is the son of boogie woogie legend Albert Ammons (1907–1949). He is the father of six children:  Marilyn, Edsel, Jr., Carol, Kenneth, Carlton, and singer Lila.  Bishop Ammons is married to Helen Ammons, the former Director of Student Life at Garrett-Evangelical Theological Seminary, Evanston, Illinois.

Education
He was a graduate of Roosevelt University, Chicago, Illinois (B.A., 1948).  He earned his Bachelor of Divinity degree from Garrett-Evangelical Theological Seminary, Evanston, Illinois (1956), and his D.Min. from Chicago Theological Seminary (1975).

Ordained ministry
Ammons was ordained, both deacon and elder, in the African Methodist Episcopal Church (1947 and 1949), pastoring churches of that denomination in Chicago and in Highland Falls, New York.  Edsel was a social case worker for the Department of Welfare of Cook County, Illinois (1951–56).  In 1957, under the influence of Bishop Charles Wesley Brashares, Ammons transferred into the Rock River Annual Conference of the Methodist Church, and was appointed to the Whitfield Methodist Church in Chicago (which became the Ingleside-Whitfield Methodist Parish).  He served this church until 1963, when he became director of urban ministry for the Rockford District.  In 1966, he was appointed to the program staff of the Annual Conference.

Ammons joined the faculty of Garrett Theological Seminary in 1968, remaining in this position until elected to the episcopacy in 1976.

Episcopal ministry
Ammons was elected by the North Central Jurisdictional Conference and assigned to the Michigan Episcopal Area (the Detroit and West Michigan Annual Conferences).  After eight years in Michigan, he was assigned to the Ohio West Area (the West Ohio Conference).

Ammons served as the president of the U.M. General Board of Discipleship (1980–84), the chairperson of the Health and Welfare Program Department (1984–88), and chairperson of the Missionary Personnel and Resources Program Department (1988–92) of the General Board of Global Ministries.

Ammons received honorary degrees from Westmar College (1975), Albion College (1979), Adrian College (1980), Mount Union College (1992) and Chicago Theological Seminary (1992).  In retirement Bishop Ammons served as bishop-in-besidence at Garrett-Evangelical.

Ammons died on December 24, 2010, in Evanston, Illinois, at age 86.

See also
 List of bishops of the United Methodist Church

References
InfoServ, the official information service of The United Methodist Church.  
The Council of Bishops of the United Methodist Church

External links
Photo of Bishop Ammons
Former Michigan Area Bishop Edsel A. Ammons Passes Away

1924 births
2010 deaths
Roosevelt University alumni
Garrett–Evangelical Theological Seminary alumni
20th-century American theologians
African-American academics
Seminary academics
Methodist theologians
United Methodist bishops of the North Central Jurisdiction
African-American Methodist clergy
American Methodist clergy
Chicago Theological Seminary alumni